Bradley Bond Buckman (born January 11, 1984) is an American retired professional basketball player.

College career
After playing high school basketball at St. Michael's Academy and Westlake, in West Lake Hills, Texas, Buckman played 4 seasons of college basketball at the University of Texas at Austin, with the Texas Longhorns.

Professional career
Buckman went undrafted in the 2006 NBA Draft. In November 2006 he was assigned to the Austin Toros of the NBA D-League.

In January 2008, he signed with the Romanian team CS Universitatea Mobitelco Cluj-Napoca.

He started the 2008–09 season in Cyprus with Keravnos Strovolos, but was released in December 2008. In January 2009 he moved to Israel and signed with Hapoel Gilboa Galil for the rest of the season. For the 2009–10 season he signed with Kepez Belediyesi of Turkey.

In September 2010, he signed a short–term deal with the German team Fraport Skyliners. He left Skyliners in October 2010. In January 2011, he moved to Turkey and signed with Antalya BB for the remainder of the season. In June 2011, he signed a one–year deal with another Turkish team Tofaş S.K.

In August 2012, he signed a one-year deal with the Spanish team Cajasol Sevilla. In December 2012, he parted ways with Sevilla. In January 2013, he moved to Germany and signed with Artland Dragons for the rest of the season.

In July 2013, he signed a one-year deal with the Turkish team Beşiktaş.

Life after basketball 
In 2015, Buckman joined AQUILA Commercial, an Austin-based full services commercial real estate firm, as a tenant representation broker.

Personal life
Buckman is married to former Survivor contestant Alexis Jones.

References

External links
Germanhoops.com Interview
TBLStat.net Profile
FIBA.com Profile
Liga ACB Profile
Eurocup Profile
Eurobasket.com Profile

1984 births
Living people
American expatriate basketball people in Cyprus
American expatriate basketball people in Germany
American expatriate basketball people in Israel
American expatriate basketball people in Romania
American expatriate basketball people in Spain
American expatriate basketball people in Turkey
Antalya Büyükşehir Belediyesi players
Artland Dragons players
Austin Toros players
Basketball players from Austin, Texas
Beşiktaş men's basketball players
Real Betis Baloncesto players
Hapoel Gilboa Galil Elyon players
Kepez Belediyesi S.K. players
Liga ACB players
McDonald's High School All-Americans
Parade High School All-Americans (boys' basketball)
Skyliners Frankfurt players
Small forwards
Texas Longhorns men's basketball players
Tofaş S.K. players
American men's basketball players